Centrolepis cephaloformis is a species of plant in the Restionaceae family and is found in southern Australia.

It blooms between August and October.

It is found on salt flats and in wet areas among mosses in the Mid West, Wheatbelt and Goldfields-Esperance regions of Western Australia where it grows in sandy-clay soils over granite.

References

cephaloformis
Plants described in 1902
Flora of Western Australia
Poales of Australia